The 2020–21 season was the 71st season in the existence of Olympique Lyonnais and the club's 32nd consecutive season in the top flight of French football. In addition to the domestic league, Lyon participated in this season's edition of the Coupe de France. The season covered the period from 1 July 2020 to 30 June 2021.

Players

First-team squad
As of 13 January 2021

Out on loan

Transfers

In

Out

Transfer summary

Spending

Summer:  €33,250,000

Winter:  €0

Total:  €33,250,000

Income

Summer:  €49,200,000

Winter:  €1,500,000

Total:  €50,700,000

Net Expenditure

Summer:  €15,950,000

Winter:  €1,500,000

Total:  €17,450,000

Competitions

Overall record

Ligue 1

League table

Results summary

Results by round

Matches
The league fixtures were announced on 9 July 2020.

Coupe de France

Statistics

Appearances and goals

|-
! colspan=14 style=background:#dcdcdc; text-align:center| Goalkeepers

|-
! colspan=14 style=background:#dcdcdc; text-align:center| Defenders

|-
! colspan=14 style=background:#dcdcdc; text-align:center| Midfielders

|-
! colspan=14 style=background:#dcdcdc; text-align:center| Forwards

|-
! colspan=14 style=background:#dcdcdc; text-align:center| Players transferred out during the season

Goalscorers

References

External links

Olympique Lyonnais seasons
Olympique Lyonnais